Solomon Islands Development Trust is a non-governmental organisation based in the Solomon Islands which promotes community development on a local level.

Work
The Trust works with other organisations, such as Australian Volunteers International (AVI). AVI has placed 35 volunteers with the Trust since 1982. A short film, titled Hart Blog Kantri was made about the partnership

In addition to these partnerships, the Trust has worked with a number of British and Commonwealth of Nations organisations

The Trust has also been involved in programmes to combat domestic violence

References

1982 establishments in the Solomon Islands
Non-profit organisations based in the Solomon Islands
Organizations established in 1982